The White Guard Volunteers  (WG) is an Volunteers  organization of Muslim Youth League - IUML   volunteer. who volunteer two year or more to flood rescue service in kerala, social service with poor communities. White Guard works in Kerala neighborhoods and rural communities in about 20 different cities  throughout Kerala  India.  White Guards were involved in rescue work during 2018 Kerala floods, 2019 Kerala floods, 2020 Kerala floods & COVID-19 pandemic.

Medi Chain Scheme
The scheme of humanitarian named Medi Chain  is being carried out by involving the volunteers at zonal and district levels. White Guard team with emergency medicine  for ex-pats Patients can send written or voice clips including their name, age, gender (female/male/transgender), and medical history.
They will check the patient information and then talk to the expert doctors if necessary and reply to the patients. About 50 doctors specializing in various fields are collaborating with this project. The services of doctors in all fields such as General Medicine, Surgery, Gynecology, Pediatrics, Ortho, ENT, and Ophthalmology are also available. In addition, the services of Ayurvedic and Homeopathic doctors have been made available

References

External links
Members of Indian Union of Muslim League clean temple in flood-hit Kerala on Eid al-Adha
MYL to resume Medi Chain scheme
See UAE expats onsite in flood-ravaged Kerala helping victims
പൊൻകുഴി ശ്രീരാമക്ഷേത്രം ശൂചീകരിച്ച് മുസ്ലീം യൂത്ത് ലീഗ് വൈറ്റ് ഗാര്‍ഡ് പ്രവര്‍ത്തകര്‍
നാടും നഗരവും അണുവിമുക്തമാക്കി വൈറ്റ് ഗാർഡുകൾ

Volunteer organisations in India